Griphopithecus is a prehistoric ape from the Miocene of Turkey and Central Europe.

Description 
Griphopithecus has been consistently grouped with stem hominoids. The material therefore indicates the range of hominoid locomotor anatomy in mid-Miocene Europe, rather than a specifically crown hominoid anatomy.

Species
Griphopithecus alpani Tekkaya, 1974
Griphopithecus suessi Abel, 1902

See also
Graecopithecus
Pierolapithecus
Anoiapithecus
Ouranopithecus
Sivapithecus
Lufengpithecus
Gigantopithecus
Khoratpithecus
Chororapithecus

References

External links
 Planet of the Apes (Scientific American/August, 2003)

Miocene primates of Europe
Fossil taxa described in 1902
Prehistoric Anatolia
Prehistoric apes
Prehistoric primate genera
Miocene primates of Asia